Markus Eberle (born 2 February 1969 in Riezlern) is an Austrian and later German former alpine skier who competed for Germany in the 1998 Winter Olympics and 2002 Winter Olympics.

References

External links
 
 

1969 births
Living people
Austrian male alpine skiers
German male alpine skiers
Olympic alpine skiers of Germany
Alpine skiers at the 1998 Winter Olympics
Alpine skiers at the 2002 Winter Olympics